Mannen som älskade träd (English: The Man, who loved trees) is a music album recorded by Swedish-Dutch folk singer-songwriter Cornelis Vreeswijk in 1985. It was recorded in Tromsø, Norway, four years after his previous album.

Track listing
"Mannen som älskade träd no. 1"
"Mannen som älskade träd no. 2"
"Babyland"
"Skyddsrumsboogie"
"En dag var hela jorden"
"Goddag yxskaft-blues"
"I väntan på Pierrot"
"Blues för Dubrovnik"
"Från mitt delfinarium"
"50-öres-blues"
"På en näverdosa"
"Sång om coyote och varför han bara sjunger om natten"
"En resa"

Cornelis Vreeswijk albums
1985 albums
Swedish-language albums